William Eli Sanford (September 16, 1838 – July 10, 1899) was a Canadian businessman, philanthropist, and politician.

Born in New York City, he was orphaned before his seventh birthday and then moved to Hamilton, Canada West, to live with his paternal aunt.

In 1887, he was summoned to the Canadian Senate. A Conservative, he represented the senatorial division of Hamilton, Ontario.

He drowned in 1899 in Lake Rosseau, Ontario. He is interred in the Sanford Family vault in Hamilton Cemetery.

External links
 
 
 

1838 births
1899 deaths
Accidental deaths in Ontario
American emigrants to pre-Confederation Ontario
Canadian senators from Ontario
Deaths by drowning in Canada
Immigrants to the Province of Canada
Politicians from Hamilton, Ontario
Politicians from New York City
Sanford family